Kuzminka is a rural locality (a village) in Vereshchaginsky District, Perm Krai, Russia. The population was 7 as of 2010.

Geography 
Kuzminka is located 22 km northeast of Vereshchagino, the district's administrative centre, by road. Sarachi is the nearest rural locality.

References 

Rural localities in Vereshchaginsky District